Nora Lane (September 12, 1905 – October 16, 1948) was an American film actress. She appeared in more than 80 films between 1927 and 1944. She committed suicide in 1948, one month after her husband died from a heart attack. She was 43.

Selected filmography

 Jesse James (1927)
 Arizona Nights (1927)
The Flying U Ranch  (1927)
 The Pioneer Scout (1928)
 A Night of Mystery (1928)
 The Gun Runner (1928)
 The Texas Tornado (1928)
 Kit Carson (1928)
 Sally (1929)
 One Hysterical Night (1929)
 Sunset Pass (1929)
 Masked Emotions (1929)
 The Cohens and the Kellys in Atlantic City (1929)
 The Man Hunter (1930)
 Rain or Shine (1930)
 King of the Wild (1931) serial
 Young Sinners (1931)
 The Cisco Kid (1931)
 Disorderly Conduct (1932)
 The Western Code (1932)
 Careless Lady (1932)
 This Sporting Age (1932)
 Jimmy the Gent (1934)
 The Outlaw Deputy (1935)
 Borderland (1937)
 Hopalong Rides Again (1937)
 Cassidy of Bar 20 (1938)
 Six-Gun Trail (1938)
 City of Chance (1940)
 Texas Renegades (1940)
 Undercover Man (1942)
 Lake Placid Serenade (1944)

References

External links

 

1905 births
1948 deaths
1948 suicides
20th-century American actresses
American film actresses
Actresses from Illinois
People from Chester, Illinois
Suicides by firearm in California
Western (genre) film actresses